Noir Island (Spanish: Isla Noir) is an island located  west of Tierra del Fuego. Cabo Noir (sometimes called "Cape Noir" in English) is the south-west cape of Isla Noir.

In literature
Cape Noir plays a role in a dramatic episode in Patrick O'Brian's novel The Golden Ocean, which is based on the historical events of Commodore George Anson's circumnavigation of the world. A squadron of ships believes they have rounded Cape Horn westwards and reached safe waters. The sight of Cape Noir evokes the realization that their longitude reckoning is grossly in error.

The episode is described by the chaplain of the Centurion:

References

External links
 United States Hydrographic Office, South America Pilot (1916)

Islands of Magallanes Region